Paola Ferrari may refer to:

 Paola Ferrari (basketball) (born 1985), Paraguayan basketball player
 Paola Ferrari (journalist) (born 1960), Italian journalist and politician

See also
 12840 Paolaferrari, a minor planet